Grovesinia is a genus of fungi in the family Sclerotiniaceae. 

The genus name of Grovesinia is in honour of James Walton Groves (1906-1970), who was a Canadian mycologist.

The genus was circumscribed by Molly Niedbalski Cline, J. Leland Crane and S.D. Cline in Mycologia vol.75 (Issue 6) on page 989 in 1983.

References

External links
Index Fungorum

Sclerotiniaceae